Abdul Aziz bin Shamsuddin (10 June 1938 – 16 October 2020) was a Malaysian politician who served as Minister of Rural and Regional Development from 2004 to 2008.

Career 
Since 1981, he had been Dr. Mahathir's political secretary. He was appointed a Senator by Mahathir Mohamad in 1999. He was one of the men named by former Deputy Prime Minister of Malaysia, Anwar Ibrahim, as part of an alleged conspiracy to oust him.

He served as Minister of Rural and Regional Development from 27 March 2004 to 18 March 2008.

Death 
Abdul Aziz Shamsuddin died on 16 October 2020 at 11.52 pm. He was 82 years old. He was to laid to rest at the Gunung Mesah Muslim Cemetery, Gopeng, Perak.

Election results

Honours
  :
  Medal of the Order of the Defender of the Realm (PPN) (1978)
  Commander of the Order of Loyalty to the Crown of Malaysia (PSM) – Tan Sri (2010)
  :
  Knight Companion of the Order of Loyalty to the Royal House of Kedah (DSDK) – Dato' (1997)
  :
  Grand Commander of the Exalted Order of Malacca (DGSM) – Datuk Seri (2004)
  :
  Knight Companion of the Order of the Crown of Pahang (DIMP) – Dato' (1999)
  Grand Knight of the Order of Sultan Ahmad Shah of Pahang (SSAP) – Dato' Sri (2004)
  :
  Knight Commander of the Order of the Perak State Crown (DPMP) – Dato' (1996)
  Knight Grand Commander of the Order of the Perak State Crown (SPMP) – Dato' Seri (2005)
  :
  Knight Commander of the Order of the Crown of Selangor (DPMS) – Dato' (2000)

References 

 

Malaysian people of Malay descent
1938 births
2020 deaths
People from Perak
Government ministers of Malaysia
United Malays National Organisation politicians
University of Malaya alumni
Members of the Dewan Negara
Medallists of the Order of the Defender of the Realm
Members of the Dewan Rakyat
Commanders of the Order of Loyalty to the Crown of Malaysia
Knights Commander of the Order of the Crown of Selangor